"Teddy's Jam" is an instrumental by American R&B group Guy, recorded for their debut studio album Guy (1988). The song was released as the album's third single in 1988.

Track listing

12", Vinyl (Promo)
"Teddy's Jam" (Extended Version)
"Teddy's Jam" (Bonus Beat)
"Teddy's Jam" (Radio Edit)
"Teddy's Jam" (Hype Mix)
"Teddy's Jazz"

12", Vinyl
"Teddy's Jam" (Extended Version) - 7:50
"Teddy's Jam" (Club Mix) - 4:36
"Teddy's Jazz" - 4:45

Personnel
editing – Greg Royal
mixing – Timmy Regisford
production – Gene Griffin, Teddy Riley
remixing – Gene Griffin, Teddy Riley

Charts

Notes

1988 singles
1988 songs
Guy (band) songs
New jack swing songs
Song recordings produced by Teddy Riley
Songs written by Aaron Hall (singer)
Songs written by Teddy Riley
Songs written by Timmy Gatling
Uptown Records singles